Kamonwan Buayam (born 15 February 1996) is an inactive Thai tennis player.

She has career-high WTA rankings of 343 in singles (achieved on 2 May 2016) and 310 in doubles (set on 20 February 2017).

Career
Buayam made her main-draw debut on WTA Tour at the 2015 PTT Pattaya Open, in the doubles event partnering Luksika Kumkhum.

ITF finals

Singles (2–1)

Doubles (3–13)

External links
 
 

1996 births
Living people
Kamonwan Buayam
Kamonwan Buayam
Tennis players at the 2014 Summer Youth Olympics
Kamonwan Buayam